Kwame Akroma-Ampim Kusi Anthony Appiah  (born 8 May 1954) is a philosopher, cultural theorist, and novelist whose interests include political and moral theory, the philosophy of language and mind, and African intellectual history. Appiah was the Laurance S. Rockefeller University Professor of Philosophy at Princeton University, before moving to New York University (NYU) in 2014. He holds an appointment at the NYU Department of Philosophy and NYU's School of Law. Appiah was elected President of the American Academy of Arts and Letters in January 2022.

Personal life and education
Appiah was born in London, England, to Peggy Cripps Appiah (née Cripps), an English art historian and writer, and Joe Appiah, a lawyer, diplomat, and politician from Ashanti Region, Ghana. For two years (1970–72) Joe Appiah was the leader of a new opposition party that was made by the country's three opposing parties. Simultaneously, he was the president of the Ghana Bar Association. Between 1977 and 1978, he was Ghana's representative at the United Nations.

Kwame Anthony Appiah was raised in Kumasi, Ghana, and educated at Bryanston School and Clare College, Cambridge, where he earned his BA (First Class) and PhD degrees in philosophy. He has three sisters: Isobel, Adwoa and Abena. As a child, he spent a good deal of time in England, staying with his grandmother Dame Isobel Cripps, widow of the English statesman Sir Stafford Cripps.

Appiah's mother's family has a long political tradition: Sir Stafford was a nephew of Beatrice Webb and was Labour Chancellor of the Exchequer (1947–50) under Clement Attlee; his father, Charles Cripps, was Labour Leader of the House of Lords (1929–31) as Lord Parmoor in Ramsay MacDonald's government; Parmoor had been a Conservative MP before defecting to Labour.

Through his grandmother Isobel Cripps, Appiah is a descendant of John Winthrop and the New England Winthrop family of Boston Brahmins as one of his ancestors, Robert Winthrop, was a Loyalist during the American Revolutionary War and migrated to England, becoming a distinguished Vice Admiral in the British Navy. Through Isobel, he is also descended from the British pharmacist James Crossley Eno.

Through Professor Appiah's father, a Nana of the Ashanti people, he is a direct descendant of Osei Tutu, the warrior emperor of pre-colonial Ghana, whose reigning successor, the Asantehene, is a distant relative of the Appiah family. Also among his African ancestors is the Ashanti nobleman Nana Akroma-Ampim I of Nyaduom, a warrior whose name the Professor now bears.

He lives with his husband, Henry Finder, an editorial director of The New Yorker, in an apartment in Manhattan, and a home in Pennington, New Jersey with a small sheep farm. Appiah has written about what it was like growing up gay in Ghana.

Appiah became a naturalized U.S. citizen in 1997. His nephew is the actor Adetomiwa Edun.

Career

Appiah taught philosophy and African-American studies at the University of Ghana, Cornell, Yale, Harvard, and Princeton Universities from 1981 to 1988. He was, until recently, the Laurance S. Rockefeller University Professor of Philosophy at Princeton (with a cross-appointment at the University Center for Human Values) and was serving as the Bacon-Kilkenny Professor of Law at Fordham University in the fall of 2008. Appiah also served on the board of PEN American Center and was on a panel of judges for the PEN/Newman's Own First Amendment Award. He has taught at Yale, Cornell, Duke, and Harvard universities and lectured at many other institutions in the US, Germany, Ghana and South Africa, and Paris. Until the fall of 2009, he served as a trustee of Ashesi University College in Accra, Ghana. Currently, he is a professor of philosophy and law at NYU.

His Cambridge dissertation explored the foundations of probabilistic semantics. In 1992, Appiah published In My Father's House, which won the Herskovitz Prize for African Studies in English. Among his later books are Colour Conscious (with Amy Gutmann), The Ethics of Identity (2005), and Cosmopolitanism: Ethics in a World of Strangers (2006). He has been a close collaborator with Henry Louis Gates Jr., with whom he edited Africana: The Encyclopedia of the African and African-American Experience. Appiah was elected a Fellow of the American Academy of Arts and Sciences in 1995.

In 2008, Appiah published Experiments in Ethics, in which he reviews the relevance of empirical research to ethical theory. In the same year, he was recognised for his contributions to racial, ethnic, and religious relations when Brandeis University awarded him the first Joseph B. and Toby Gittler Prize.

As well as his academic work, Appiah has also published several works of fiction. His first novel, Avenging Angel, set at the University of Cambridge, involved a murder among the Cambridge Apostles; Sir Patrick Scott is the detective in the novel. Appiah's second and third novels are Nobody Likes Letitia and Another Death in Venice.

Appiah has been nominated for, or received, several honours. He was the 2009 finalist in the arts and humanities for the Eugene R. Gannon Award for the Continued Pursuit of Human Advancement. In 2010, he was named by Foreign Policy magazine on its list of top global thinkers. On 13 February 2012, Appiah was awarded the National Humanities Medal at a ceremony at the White House.

Appiah currently chairs the jury for the Berggruen Prize, and serves on the Berggruen Institute's Philosophy & Culture Center's Academic Board. He was elected as President of the American Academy of Arts and Letters in January 2022.

Ideas
Appiah argues that the formative denotation of culture is preceded by the efficacy of intellectual interchange. From this position he views organisations such as UNICEF and Oxfam in two lights: on the one hand he seems to appreciate the immediate action these organisations provide while on the other he points out their long-term futility. His focus is, instead, on the long-term political and economic development of nations according to the Western capitalist/democratic model, an approach that relies on continued growth in the "marketplace" that is the capital-driven modern world.

However, when capitalism is introduced and it does not "take off" as in the Western world, the livelihood of the peoples involved is at stake. Thus, the ethical questions involved are certainly complex, yet the general impression in Appiah's "Kindness to Strangers" is one which implies that it is not up to "us" to save the poor and starving, but up to their own governments. Nation-states must assume responsibility for their citizens, and a cosmopolitan's role is to appeal to "our own" government to ensure that these nation-states respect, provide for, and protect their citizens.

If they will not, "we" are obliged to change their minds; if they cannot, "we" are obliged to provide assistance, but only our "fair share," that is, not at the expense of our own comfort, or the comfort of those "nearest and dearest" to us.

Appiah's early philosophical work dealt with probabilistic semantics and theories of meaning, but his more recent books have tackled philosophical problems of race and racism, identity, and moral theory. His current work tackles three major areas: 1. the philosophical foundations of liberalism; 2. the questioning of methods in arriving at knowledge about values; and 3. the connections between theory and practice in moral life, all of which concepts can also be found in his book Cosmopolitanism: Ethics in a World of Strangers.

On postmodern culture, Appiah writes, "Postmodern culture is the culture in which all postmodernisms operate, sometimes in synergy, sometimes in competition; and because contemporary culture is, in a certain sense to which I shall return, transnational, postmodern culture is globalthough that emphatically does not mean that it is the culture of every person in the world."

Cosmopolitanism

Appiah has been influenced by the cosmopolitanist philosophical tradition, which stretches from German thinkers such as G. W. F. Hegel to African American thinkers like W. E. B. Du Bois, among others. In his article "Education for Global Citizenship", Appiah outlines his conception of cosmopolitanism. He therein defines cosmopolitanism as "universality plus difference". Building from this definition, he asserts that the first takes precedence over the latter, that is: different cultures are respected "not because cultures matter in themselves, but because people matter, and culture matters to people." But Appiah first defined it as its problems but ultimately determines that practising a citizenship of the world and conversation is not only helpful in a post-9/11 world. Therefore, according to Appiah's take on this ideology, cultural differences are to be respected in so far as they are not harmful to people and in no way conflict with our universal concern for every human's life and well-being.

In his book Cosmopolitanism: Ethics in a World of Strangers (2006), Appiah introduces two ideas that "intertwine in the notion of cosmopolitanism" (Emerging, 69). The first is the idea that we have obligations to others that are bigger than just sharing citizenship. The second idea is that we should never take for granted the value of life and become informed of the practices and beliefs of others. Kwame Appiah frequents university campuses to speak to students. One request he makes is, "See one movie with subtitles a month."

In Lies that Bind (2018), Appiah attempts to deconstruct identities of creed, colour, country, and class.

Criticism of Afrocentric world view
Appiah has been a critic of contemporary theories of Afrocentrism. In his 1997 essay "Europe Upside Down: Fallacies of the New Afrocentrism," he argues that current Afrocentricism is striking for "how thoroughly at home it is in the frameworks of nineteenth century European thought," particularly as a mirror image to Eurocentric constructions of race and a preoccupation with the ancient world. Appiah also finds an irony in the conception that if the source of the West lies in ancient Egypt via Greece, then "its legacy of ethnocentrism is presumably one of our moral liabilities."

In popular culture
 In 2007, Appiah was a contributing scholar in the PBS-broadcast documentary Prince Among Slaves produced by Unity Productions Foundation.
 In 2007 he also appeared in the TV documentary series Racism: A History as an on-screen contributor.
 Appiah appeared alongside a number of contemporary philosophers in Astra Taylor's 2008 film Examined Life, discussing his views on cosmopolitanism.
In 2009, he was an on-screen contributor to the movie Herskovits: At the Heart of Blackness.
 In 2015, he became one of three contributors to the New York Times Magazine column "The Ethicist", before assuming sole authorship of the column later that year.
 He delivered the BBC's Reith Lectures in late 2016 on the theme of Mistaken Identities.
 In late 2016, he contended that Western civilization did not exist, and argued that many uniquely Western attributes and values were instead shared among many "non-western" cultures and/or eras.
 In 2018, Appiah appeared in the episode "Can We Live Forever?" of the documentary series Explained.

Awards and honours 

 Anisfield-Wolf Book Award for In My Father's House, April 1993
 Honorable Mention, James Russell Lowell Prize of the Modern Language Association for In My Father's House, December 1993
 1993 Herskovits Award of the African Studies Association "for the best work published in English on Africa", for In My Father's House, December 1993 
 Annual Book Award, 1996, North American Society for Social Philosophy, "for the book making the most significant contribution to social philosophy" for Color Conscious, May 1997 
 Ralph J. Bunche Award, American Political Science Association, "for the best scholarly work in political science which explores the phenomenon of ethnic and cultural pluralism" for Color Conscious, July 1997 
 Outstanding Book on the subject of human rights in North America, Gustavus Myers Center for the Study of Human Rights in North America, for Color Conscious, 10 December 1997 
Elected member of the American Philosophical Society 
 Honorable Mention, Gustavus Myers Outstanding Book Award, Gustavus Myers Center for the Study of Bigotry and Human Rights for The Ethics of Identity, 9 December 2005 
 Editors' Choice New York Times Book Review, The Ethics of Identity, 26 June 2005. 
 Amazon.com Best Books of 2005, Top 10 Editors' Picks: Nonfiction, The Ethics of Identity, December 2005 
 Arthur Ross Book Award of the Council on Foreign Relations, Cosmopolitanism, May 2007 
 Finalist for Estoril Global Ethics Book Prize, for Cosmopolitanism (2009) 
 A Times Literary Supplement'''s Book of the Year 2010 for The Honor Code 
 One of New York Times Book Reviews 100 Notable Books of 2010 for The Honor Code 
 New Jersey Council for the Humanities Book Award 2011 for The Honor Code 
 Global Thought Leaders Index 2015, No. 95, The World Post
 In August 2016, he was enstooled as the Nkosuahene' of Nyaduom, a Ghanaian chief of the Ashanti people, in Nyaduom - his family's ancestral chiefdom in Ghana.
 In 2017 he was elected as a Fellow of the Royal Society of LiteratureOnwuemezi, Natasha (7 June 2017), "Rankin, McDermid and Levy named new RSL fellows", The Bookseller.
 In June 2017 he was named by the Carnegie Corporation of New York as one of its 2017 "Great Immigrants""Kwame Anthony Appiah, NYU Philosopher, Named 'Great Immigrant'", New York University, 29 June 2017.
 In December 2021, he received the prestigious Gold Medal from The National Institute of Social Sciences.
In June 2022, Professor Appiah received an Honorary Degree from Cambridge University. This is a degree that is bestowed upon people who have made outstanding achievements in their respective fields.

Bibliography

Books
 
 
 
 
 With 
With 
 
With 
 
 Translated as: 
 Translated as: 
 
 Translated as: 
  (En coedición con el Centro de Cultura Contemporánea de Barcelona.)
 
 
  Original lecture.
  Based on The 2013 Paul Carus Lectures. Cambridge: Harvard University Press, 2017.
 The Lies That Bind: Rethinking Identity—Creed, Country, Color, Class, Culture. London: Profile Books, 2018 and New York: Liveright Publishing, Profile Books, 2018 

Novels
 
 
 

Book chapters
 
 
 
 
 
 
 
 
  Fernande Saint-Martin sous la direction de Bogumil Jewsiewicki et Jocelyn Létourneau, Actes du Célat No. 6, Mai 1992.
 
 
 
  Pdf.
 
 
 
 
 
 
 
 
  Pdf. 
 

Journal articles
 
 
 
 
 
 
 
 
 
 
  Publisher's website.
 
 
 
 
 
 
 
 —"The Key to All Mythologies" (review of Emmanuelle Loyer, Lévi-Strauss: A Biography, translated from the French by Ninon Vinsonneau and Jonathan Magidoff, Polity, 2019, 744 pp.; and Maurice Godelier, Claude Lévi-Strauss: A Critical Study of His Thought, translated from the French by Nora Scott, Verso, 2019, 540 pp.), The New York Review of Books, vol. LXVII, no. 2 (13 February 2020), pp. 18–20. Appiah concludes his review (p. 20): "Lévi-Strauss... was... an inspired interpreter, a brilliant reader''.... When the landmarks of science succeed in advancing their subject, they need no longer be consulted: physicists don't study Newton; chemists don't pore over Lavoisier.... If some part of Lévi-Strauss's scholarly oeuvre survives, it will be because his scientific aspirations have not."

See also
 Black British nobility, Appiah's class in Britain
 African philosophy
 Africana philosophy

References

Further reading

External links

 
 Appiah's Princeton home page
 Appiah's Princeton professional page
 An in-depth autobiographical interview with Appiah
 
 

1954 births
20th-century African-American writers
20th-century American male writers
20th-century American philosophers
20th-century British male writers
20th-century British philosophers
20th-century essayists
20th-century novelists
21st-century African-American writers
21st-century American male writers
21st-century American philosophers
21st-century British male writers
21st-century British philosophers
21st-century essayists
21st-century novelists
Academics from London
African-American educators
African-American novelists
African-American philosophers
Black studies scholars
Alumni of Clare College, Cambridge
American academic administrators
American ethicists
American gay writers
American male essayists
American male non-fiction writers
American male novelists
American social commentators
Analytic philosophers
British academic administrators
British ethicists
British gay writers
British male essayists
British male novelists
British social commentators
Carnegie Council for Ethics in International Affairs
Cornell University faculty
Critics of Afrocentrism
Duke University faculty
English emigrants to Ghana
English emigrants to the United States
English people of Ashanti descent
Epistemologists
Fellows of the American Academy of Arts and Sciences
Gay academics
Ghanaian emigrants to the United States
Ghanaian novelists
Ghanaian philosophers
Harvard University faculty
Intellectual history
Ghanaian LGBT people
LGBT philosophers
Living people
Members of the American Philosophical Society
Metaphysicians
Metaphysics writers
Miller Center Affiliates
National Humanities Medal recipients
Ontologists
People educated at Bryanston School
People from Pennington, New Jersey
People from Kumasi
People with acquired American citizenship
Philosophers from New York (state)
Philosophers of culture
Philosophers of history
Philosophers of language
Philosophers of mind
Philosophers of social science
Philosophy academics
Political philosophers
Presidents of the American Philosophical Association
Princeton University faculty
Social philosophers
Theorists on Western civilization
Winthrop family
Writers about activism and social change
Writers about globalization
Presidents of the American Academy of Arts and Letters
Presidents of the Modern Language Association